Compartment syndrome is a condition in which increased pressure within one of the body's anatomical compartments results in insufficient blood supply to tissue within that space. There are two main types: acute and chronic. Compartments of the leg or arm are most commonly involved.

Symptoms of acute compartment syndrome (ACS) can include severe pain, poor pulses, decreased ability to move, numbness, or a pale color of the affected limb. It is most commonly due to physical trauma such as a bone fracture (up to 75% of cases) or crush injury, but it can also be caused by acute exertion during sport. It can also occur after blood flow returns following a period of poor blood flow. Diagnosis is generally based upon a person's symptoms and may be supported by measurement of intracompartmental pressure before, during, and after activity. Normal compartment pressure should be within 12-18 mmHg; anything greater than that is considered abnormal and would need treatment. Treatment is by surgery to open the compartment, completed in a timely manner. If not treated within six hours, permanent muscle or nerve damage can result.

In chronic compartment syndrome (aka chronic exertional compartment syndrome), there is generally pain with exercise but the pain dissipates once activity ceases. Other symptoms may include numbness. Symptoms typically resolve with rest. Common activities that trigger chronic compartment syndrome include running and biking. Generally, this condition does not result in permanent damage. Other conditions that may present similarly include stress fractures and tendinitis. Treatment may include physical therapy or—if that is not effective—surgery.

Acute compartment syndrome occurs in about 3% of those who have a midshaft fracture of the forearm. Rates in other areas of the body and for chronic cases are unknown. The condition occurs more often in males and people under the age of 35, in line with the occurrence of trauma. Compartment syndrome was first described in 1881 by German surgeon Richard von Volkmann. Untreated, acute compartment syndrome can result in Volkmann's contracture.

Signs and symptoms
Compartment syndrome usually presents within a few hours of an inciting event, but may present anytime up to 48 hours after. The limb affected by compartment syndrome is often associated with a firm, wooden feeling or a deep palpation, and is usually described as feeling tight. There may also be decrease pulses in the limb along with associated paresthesia. Usually, the pain cannot be relieved by NSAIDs. Range of motion may be limited while the compartment pressure is high. In acute compartment syndrome, the pain will not be relieved with rest. In chronic exertional compartment syndrome the pain will dissipate with rest.

Acute

There are five characteristic signs and symptoms related to acute compartment syndrome: pain, paraesthesia (reduced sensation), paralysis, pallor, and pulselessness. Pain and paresthesia are the early symptoms of compartment syndrome.

Common
Pain – A person may experience pain disproportionate to the findings of the physical examination. This pain may not be relieved by strong analgesic medications. The pain is aggravated by passively stretching the muscle group within the compartment. However, such pain may disappear in the late stages of the compartment syndrome. The role of local anesthesia in delaying the diagnosis of compartment syndrome is still being debated.
Paresthesia (altered sensation)  – A person may complain of "pins & needles", numbness, and a tingling sensation. This may progress to loss of sensation (anesthesia) if no intervention is made.
Uncommon
Paralysis –  Paralysis of the limb is a rare, late finding. It may indicate both a nerve or muscular lesion.
Pallor and pulselessness – A lack of pulse rarely occurs in patients, as pressures that cause compartment syndrome are often well below arterial pressures. Absent pulses only occur when there is arterial injury or during the late stages of the compartment syndrome, when compartment pressures are very high. Pallor can also result from arterial occlusion.

Chronic
The symptoms of chronic exertional compartment syndrome, CECS, may involve pain, tightness, cramps, weakness, and diminished sensation. This pain can occur for months, and in some cases over a period of years, and may be relieved by rest.  Moderate weakness in the affected region can also be observed. These symptoms are brought on by exercise and consist of a sensation of extreme tightness in the affected muscles followed by a painful burning sensation if exercise is continued. After exercise is ceased, the pressure in the compartment will decrease within a few minutes, relieving painful symptoms. Symptoms will occur at a certain threshold of exercise which varies from person to person but is rather consistent for a given individual.  This threshold can range anywhere from 30 seconds of running to 2–3 miles of running. CECS most commonly occurs in the lower leg, with the anterior compartment being the most frequently affected compartment.  Foot drop is a common symptom of CECS.

Complications
Failure to relieve the pressure can result in the death of tissues (necrosis) in the affected anatomical compartment, since the ability of blood to enter the smallest vessels in the compartment (capillary perfusion pressure) will fall.  This, in turn, leads to progressively increasing oxygen deprivation of the tissues dependent on this blood supply. Without sufficient oxygen, the tissue will die.  On a large scale, this can cause Volkmann's contracture in affected limbs, a permanent and irreversible process.  Other reported complications include neurological deficits of the affected limb, gangrene, and chronic regional pain syndrome.    Rhabdomyolysis and subsequent kidney failure are also possible complications.  In some case series, rhabdomyolysis is reported in 23% of patients with ACS.

Causes

Acute
Acute compartment syndrome (ACS) is a medical emergency that can develop after traumatic injuries, such as in automobile accidents or dynamic sporting activities – for example, a severe crush injury or an open or closed fracture of an extremity. Rarely, ACS can develop after a relatively minor injury, or due to another medical issue.  The lower legs and the forearms are the most frequent sites affected by compartment syndrome. Other areas of the body such as thigh, buttock, hand, abdomen, and foot can also be affected. The most common cause of acute compartment syndrome is fracture of a bone, most commonly the tibia. There is no difference between acute compartment syndrome originating from an open or closed fracture. Leg compartment syndrome is found in 2% to 9% of tibial fractures. It is strongly related to fractures involving the tibial diaphysis as well as other sections of the tibia. Direct injury to blood vessels can lead to compartment syndrome by reducing the downstream blood supply to soft tissues. This reduction in blood supply can cause a series of inflammatory reactions that promote the swelling of the soft tissues. Such inflammation can be further worsened by reperfusion therapy. Because the fascia layer that defines the compartment of the limbs does not stretch, a small amount of bleeding into the compartment, or swelling of the muscles within the compartment, can cause the pressure to rise greatly. Intravenous drug injection, casts, prolonged limb compression, crush injuries, anabolic steroid use, vigorous exercise, and eschar from burns can also cause compartment syndrome. Patients on anticoagulant therapy have an increased risk of bleeding into a closed compartment.

Abdominal compartment syndrome occurs when the intra-abdominal pressure exceeds 20 mmHg and abdominal perfusion pressure is less than 60 mmHg.  This disease process is associated with organ dysfunction and multiple organ failures. There are many causes, which can be broadly grouped into three mechanisms: primary (internal bleeding and swelling); secondary (vigorous fluid replacement as an unintended complication of resuscitative medical treatment, leading to the acute formation of ascites and a rise in intra-abdominal pressure); and recurrent (compartment syndrome that has returned after the initial treatment of secondary compartment syndrome).

Compartment syndrome after snake bite is rare. Its incidence varies from 0.2 to 1.36% as recorded in case reports. Compartment syndrome is more common in children possibly due to inadequate volume of the bodily fluid to dilute the snake venom. Increased white blood cell count of more than 1,650/μL and aspartate transaminase (AST) level of more than 33.5 U/L could increase the risk of developing compartment syndrome. Otherwise, those bitten by venomous snake should be observed for 48 hours to exclude the possibility of compartment syndrome.

Acute compartment syndrome due to severe/uncontrolled hypothyroidism is rare.

Chronic
When compartment syndrome is caused by repetitive use of the muscles, it is known as chronic compartment syndrome (CCS). This is usually not an emergency, but the loss of circulation can cause temporary or permanent damage to nearby nerves and muscles.

A subset of chronic compartment syndrome is chronic exertional compartment syndrome (CECS), often called exercise-induced compartment syndrome (EICS). Oftentimes, CECS is a diagnosis of exclusion. CECS of the leg is a condition caused by exercise which results in increased tissue pressure within an anatomical compartment due to an acute increase in muscle volume – as much as 20% is possible during exercise. When this happens, pressure builds up in the tissues and muscles causing tissue ischemia. An increase in muscle weight will reduce the compartment volume of the surrounding fascial borders and result in an increased compartment pressure. An increase in the pressure of the tissue can force fluid to leak into the interstitial space (extracellular fluid), leading to a disruption of the micro-circulation of the leg. This condition occurs commonly in the lower leg and various other locations within the body, such as the foot or forearm. CECS can be seen in athletes who train rigorously in activities that involve constant repetitive actions or motions.

Pathophysiology
In a normal human body, blood flow from the arterial system (higher pressure) to venous system (lower pressure) requires a pressure gradient. When this pressure gradient is diminished, blood flow from the artery to the vein is reduced. This causes a backup of blood and excessive fluid to leak from the capillary wall into spaces between the soft tissues cells, causing swelling of the extracellular space and a rise in intracompartmental pressure. This swelling of the soft tissues surrounding the blood vessels compresses the blood and lymphatic vessels further, causing more fluid to enter the extracellular spaces, leading to additional compression. The pressure continues to increase due to the non-compliant nature of the fascia containing the compartment.  This worsening cycle can eventually lead to a lack of sufficient oxygen in the soft tissues (tissue ischemia) and tissue death (necrosis). Tingling and abnormal sensation (paraesthesia) can begin as early as 30 minutes from the start of tissue ischemia and permanent damage can occur as early as 12 hours from the onset of the inciting injury.

Diagnosis
Compartment syndrome is a clinical diagnosis, meaning that a medical provider's examination and the patient's history usually give the diagnosis. Apart from the typical signs and symptoms, measurement of intracompartmental pressure can also be important for diagnosis. Using a combination of clinical diagnosis and serial intracompartmental pressure measurements increases both the sensitivity and specificity of diagnosing compartment syndrome. A transducer connected to a catheter is inserted 5 cm into the zone of injury. A compartment pressure no less than 30 mmHg of the diastolic pressure in a conscious or unconscious person is associated with compartment syndrome. Fasciotomy is indicated in that case. For those patients with low blood pressure (hypotension), a pressure of 20 mmHg higher than the intracompartmental pressure is associated with compartmental syndrome. Noninvasive methods of diagnosis such as near-infraredspectroscopy (NIRS) which uses sensors on the skin, shows promise in controlled settings. However, with limited data in uncontrolled settings, clinical presentation and intracompartmental pressure remain the gold standard for diagnosis.

Chronic exertional compartment syndrome is usually a diagnosis of exclusion, with the hallmark finding being absence of symptoms at rest.  Measurement of intracompartmental pressures during symptom reproduction (usually immediately following running) is the most useful test. Imaging studies (X-ray, CT, MRI) can be useful in ruling out other more common diagnoses instead of confirming the diagnosis of compartment syndrome. Additionally, MRI has been shown to be effective in diagnosing chronic exertional compartment syndrome. The average duration of symptoms prior to diagnosis is 28 months.

Treatment

Acute

Any external compression (tourniquet, orthopedic casts or dressings applied on the affected limb) should be removed. Cutting of the cast will reduce the intracompartmental pressure by 65%, followed by 10 to 20% pressure reduction once padding is cut. After removal of the external compression the limb should be placed at the level of the heart. The vital signs of the patient should be closely monitored. If the clinical condition does not improve, then fasciotomy is indicated to decompress the compartments. An incision large enough to decompress all the compartments is necessary. This surgical procedure is performed inside an operating theater under general or local anesthesia. The timing of the fasciotomy wound closure is debated.  Some surgeons suggest wound closure should be done seven days after fasciotomy. Multiple techniques exist for closure of the surgical site including vacuum-assisted and shoelace. Both techniques are acceptable methods for closure, but the vacuum-assisted technique has led to longer hospitalization time. A skin graft may be required to close the wound, which would complicate the treatment with a much longer hospitalization stay.

Chronic
Treatment for chronic exertional compartment syndrome can include decreasing or subsiding exercise and/or exacerbating activities, massage, non-steroidal anti-inflammatory medication, and physiotherapy. Chronic compartment syndrome in the lower leg can be treated conservatively or surgically. Conservative treatment includes rest, anti-inflammatory medications, and manual decompression. Warming the affected area with a heating pad may help to loosen the fascia prior to exercise. Icing the area may result in further constriction of the fascia and is not recommended before exercise. The use of devices that apply external pressure to the area, such as splints, casts, and tight wound dressings, should be avoided. If symptoms persist after conservative treatment or if an individual does not wish to give up the physical activities which bring on symptoms, compartment syndrome can be treated by a surgery known as a fasciotomy.

A US military study conducted in 2012 found that teaching individuals with lower leg chronic exertional compartment syndrome to change their running style to a forefoot running technique abated symptoms in those with symptoms limited to the anterior compartment. Running with a forefoot strike limits use of the tibialis anterior muscle which may explain the relief in symptoms in those with anterior compartment syndrome.

Hyperbaric oxygen therapy has been suggested by case reports – though as of 2011 not proven in randomized control trials – to be an effective adjunctive therapy for crush injury, compartment syndrome, and other acute traumatic ischemias, by improving wound healing and reducing the need for repetitive surgery.

Prognosis
A mortality rate of 47% has been reported for acute compartment syndrome of the thigh. According to one study the rate of fasciotomy for acute compartment syndrome varied from 2% to 24%. This is due to uncertainty and differences in labeling a condition as acute compartment syndrome. The most significant prognostic factor in people with acute compartment syndrome is time to diagnosis and subsequent fasciotomy. In people with a missed or late diagnosis of acute compartment syndrome, limb amputation may be necessary for survival. Following a fasciotomy, some symptoms may be permanent depending on factors such as which compartment, time until fasciotomy, and muscle necrosis. Muscle necrosis can occur quickly, within 3 hours of original injury in some studies. Fasciotomy of the lateral compartment of the leg may lead to symptoms due to the nerves and muscles in that compartment. These may include foot drop, numbness along leg, numbness of big toe, pain, and loss of foot eversion.

Epidemiology
In one case series of 164 people with acute compartment syndrome, 69% of the cases had an associated fracture. The authors of that article also calculated an annual incidence of acute compartment syndrome of 1 to 7.3 per 100,000.  There are significant differences in the incidence of acute compartment syndrome based on age and gender in the setting of trauma.  Men are ten times more likely than women to develop ACS. The mean age for ACS in men is 30 years while the mean age is 44 years for women. Acute compartment syndrome may occur more often in individuals less than 35 years old due to increased muscle mass within the compartments .  The anterior compartment of the leg is the most common site for ACS.

See also 
 Abdominal compartment syndrome
 Escharotomy
 Ischemia-reperfusion injury of the appendicular musculoskeletal system

References

External links 

Compartment Syndrome of the Forearm – Orthopaedia.com
Chronic Exertional Compartment Syndrome detailed at MayoClinic.com

Compartment syndrome
American Association of Orthopaedic Surgeons Compartment Syndrome

Disorders of fascia
Syndromes
Early complications of trauma
Wikipedia medicine articles ready to translate
Wikipedia emergency medicine articles ready to translate